The Maxx was a retail store operated by the TJX Companies. It was operated by T.J. Maxx, but they did not sell clothes or home furnishings.

They operated 2 stores, one in Natick, Massachusetts and another in Braintree, Massachusetts.

References
News Article about New "The Maxx" Store

External links
TJX Companies Official Website

TJX Companies
American companies established in 2006
Retail companies established in 2006
Retail companies disestablished in 2009
Defunct retail companies of the United States